In law, subjective standard and objective standards are legal standards for knowledge or beliefs of a plaintiff or defendant. 

An objective standard of reasonableness ascertains the knowledge of a person by viewing a situation from the standpoint of a hypothetical reasonable person, without considering the particular physical and psychological characteristics of the defendant. A subjective standard of reasonableness asks whether the circumstances would produce an honest and reasonable belief in a person having the particular mental and physical characteristics of the defendant, such as their personal knowledge and personal history, when the same circumstances might not produce the same in a general reasonable person.

People v. Serravo (1992) hinged on the distinction. In People v. Serravo, the court found that the standard of knowledge of moral wrongness in the M'Naghten rule is the objective standard. The court wrote, "Moral wrong can be interpreted either by a purely personal and subjective standard or morality or by a societal and presumably more objective standard. We believe that the better reasoned interpretation of 'wrong in the term 'incapable of distinguishing right from wrong' refers to a wrongful act measured by societal standard of morality."

References

Criminal law legal terminology